Jordan Schur is an American entrepreneur, record executive and film producer. He is currently co-chairman and CEO of the film production company Mimran Schur Pictures. He is also the former President of Geffen Records, the founder of Flip Records and Suretone Records as well as the Chairman and CEO of the music, television, and film production company Suretone Entertainment.

Career
In 1999, the 35 year-old Schur took over as president of Geffen Records. In 2003, Schur also became president of MCA Records and oversaw the acquisition of DreamWorks Records, and merged them into the newly formed Geffen Records label.

In 2006, Schur left Geffen Records and established Suretone Records, a joint venture with Interscope Records.  He also launched the MTV reality series Buzzin' that highlighted the rise of Suretone artist Shwayze.

In 2009, Schur and longtime friend David Mimran partnered to form the film production company Mimran Schur Pictures. Their first film was Stone, followed by Henry's Crime. Both films premiered at Toronto. In 2011, Mimran Schur Pictures partnered with Lionsgate to release the action drama Warrior. Other Mimran Schur Pictures projects include Pawn Shop Chronicles. In 2017 Mimran Schur Picture invested over $10 million in co-financing the box office movies Holmes and Watson and Bloodshot.

He produced the film The Kid for Lionsgate Films.

Television

External links

References 

Year of birth missing (living people)
Living people
American entertainment industry businesspeople